Kodaganallur is a village on the banks of the river Tamaraparani in Tamil Nadu, located near the Laccadive sea in the south of India. It is located 15 kilometres from Tirunelveli on the Tirunelveli-Cheranmadevi state highway.

Temples
The village of Kodaganallur houses ancient temples dating back to the 12th century - a Vishnu temple for Sri Brahanmmadhava Swamy and a Shiva temple for Sri Abhimukt Ewara and Sri Kailasanatha - one of the Nava Kailasas.

Sri Abhimuktheswarar: This temple was located towards west. God Name  - Abhimuktheswarar. Ambal        - Soundaravalli 
Shivalingam made by a stone called panalingam, which was brought by great saint Gangadhara swamigal from kasi. We can found Gangadhara swamigal jeeva samadhi nearby temple and river.
Five Vinayagar, Five Panalingam and three guru are at same one Sivan temple.
Three Guru at one Temple -
Saint Shri Maha Dev Swamigal... (Jeeva Samadhi) near the river facing west, Sri Sankara statue next to the big pillar facing east.
Sri Daskshinamoorthi at temple facing towards south.
Adisankarar Mutt
Sri Adisankarar mutt was nearby Avimuktheeswarar temple.

See also
 Nava Kailasam

References

External links
Website on Kodaganallur
An organisation known as YOKE (Youth of Kodaganallur Endeavor) now educates the children of the village with various activities

Villages in Tirunelveli district